Reinaldo Vicente Simão (born 23 October 1968), known as just Simão, is a Brazilian former professional footballer who played as a defensive midfielder. Simão played for several clubs throughout his career, most of which were in the Campeonato Brasileiro in the 1990s. He also spent three years at Japanese side Bellmare Hiratsuka, and had spell in the Turkish Süper Lig with Fenerbahçe and Ankaragücü.

Club statistics

References

External links

1968 births
Living people
Brazilian footballers
Brazilian expatriate footballers
Fenerbahçe S.K. footballers
MKE Ankaragücü footballers
Süper Lig players
Brazilian expatriate sportspeople in Turkey
Expatriate footballers in Turkey
Association football midfielders
Sport Club Corinthians Paulista players
Sport Club Internacional players
Esporte Clube Juventude players
Associação Portuguesa de Desportos players
Associação Desportiva São Caetano players
Goiás Esporte Clube players
Shonan Bellmare players
J1 League players
Expatriate footballers in Japan
Campeonato Brasileiro Série A players
Footballers from São Paulo